Hythe Town Football Club is a football club based in Hythe, Kent, England.

History
The original club was established in August 1910. They joined the Folkestone & District League, winning the title four times after World War I. In 1936 the club moved up to the Kent County Amateur League, joining Division Two of the Eastern Section. They won the division at the first attempt, but were not promoted. They won the division again the following season, and this time were promoted to Division One. Following World War II the club was placed in the South Division for the 1946–47 and 1947–48 seasons, before league reorganisation in 1948 saw them return to Division One of the Eastern Section.

Division One was later renamed the Premier Division and Hythe were relegated to Division One. However, after winning the Division One title in 1971–72 they went on to win three consecutive Premier Division titles between 1973–74 and 1975–76. The club were Premier Division runners-up in 1976–77, after which the club moved up to the Kent League. The club were Kent League runners-up in 1978–79, 1982–83 and 1984–85, and after winning the league title in 1988–89, they were promoted to the Southern Division of the Southern League. The following year the club reached the semi-finals of the FA Vase, losing 4–3 to Yeading. After three seasons in the Southern League, they folded in 1992.

Supporters subsequently formed a successor club, Hythe United, which joined Division One East of the Kent County League for the 1992–93 season. Despite only finishing sixth in their first season, the club was promoted to the Premier Division. After finishing ninth in the Premier Division in 1994–95, they rejoined the Kent League. In 2001 the name was changed to Hythe Town, and in 2008–09 they finished the season as Kent League runners-up. In 2010–11 the club were Kent League champions, earning promotion to Division One South of the Isthmian League.

The 2010–11 season saw Hythe reach the first round of the FA Cup for the first time, losing 5–1 at Hereford United. They won the Kent Senior Cup for the first time the following season, defeating Dartford 1–0 in the final. A fourth-place finish in the in 2012–13 secured qualification for the promotion play-offs; the club went on to lose 3–0 to Faversham Town in the semi-finals. Another fourth-place finish in 2015–16 led to another play-off campaign, in which they were beaten 7–0 by Worthing in the semi-finals.

Ground
The club moved to its Reachfields ground in 1977, which had previously been an army sports ground next to a firing range. The record attendance of 2,147 was set for the FA Vase semi-final match against Yeading in 1990 The ground currently has a capacity of 3,000, of which 350 is seated and 2,400 covered.

Honours
Kent League
Champions 1988–89, 2010–11
Kent County League
Eastern Section Premier Division champions 1973–74, 1974–75, 1975–76
Eastern Section Division One champions 1971–72
Eastern Section Division Two champions 1936–37, 1937–38
League Cup winners 1949–50, 1953–54, 1972–73, 1974–75, 1975–76
Eastern Section Benevolent Cup winners 1949–50
Eastern Section Division Two Benevolent Cup winners 1936–37
Kent Senior Cup
Winners 2011–12
Kent Senior Trophy
Winners 1990–91
Eastern Professional Floodlight Cup
Winners 1989–90, 1990–91

Records
Best FA Cup performance: First round, 2010–11
Best FA Vase performance: Semi-finals, 1989–90
Record attendance: 2,147 vs Yeading, FA Vase semi-final, 1990
Biggest win: 10–1 vs Sporting Bengal United, 2008–09
Heaviest defeat: 10–1 vs Swanley Furness, 1997–98
Most appearances: Dave Cook
Most goals: Dave Cook

See also
Hythe Town F.C. players
Hythe Town F.C. managers

References

External links
Official website

 
Football clubs in England
Football clubs in Kent
Association football clubs established in 1910
1910 establishments in England
Folkestone and Hythe District
Kent County League
Southern Counties East Football League
Southern Football League clubs
Isthmian League